Misztal is a Polish surname, and it may refer to:

 Franciszek Misztal (1901, in Lisie Jamy  1981), a Polish aeronautical engineer
  (born 1936, in ), Polish priest and professor
  (born 1946), Polish sociologist, professor of the Warsaw University
  (1950, in Męciszów  2006), Polish professor of pharmaceutical sciences at the Medical University of Lublin
  (born 1953, in Hrubieszów), Polish politician, doctor, deputy to the Polish Parliament
 Piotr Misztal (born 1965, in Łódź), a Polish businessman and politician
 Piotr Misztal (born 1987, [?]), a Polish footballer

Miśtal 
 Grzegorz Miśtal (born 1973, Kraków), Polish movie-, TV- and theater actor

References